Villa Tapia is a town in the Province of Hermanas Mirabal in the Dominican Republic.

References

Sources 
 – World-Gazetteer.com

Populated places in Hermanas Mirabal Province
Municipalities of the Dominican Republic